= Brandi Ahzionae =

American activist

Brandi Ahzionae is an activist and advocate for transgender rights in Washington, DC. She started the blog DMV Trans Circulator, which aims to build a community of positive transgender people. Professionally, Ahzionae also works as a hair stylist.
